Youmacon is an annual four-day anime convention held during November at the Detroit Marriott at the Renaissance Center and Huntington Place in Detroit, Michigan. Youmacon's creation was inspired by other conventions including Anime Central and Ohayocon, with the convention's name coming from the Japanese word for demon or ghost. Founded by Morgan Kollin in 2005, it is the largest anime/gaming convention in Michigan. Midwest Media Expo was the convention's sister event.

Programming
The convention typically offers anime music videos, Artist Alley, Charity Masquerade Ball, concerts, costume competitions, Dealers Room, gaming tournaments, karaoke, Live Action Mario Party and Donkey Kong, live musical performances, maid café, masquerade, Mystery Science Theater 4000, rave, table-top gaming, talent competitions, and video gaming.

The convention runs programming for 24 hours a day in Huntington Place. The walk between the Detroit Marriott at the Renaissance Center and Huntington Place is about 15 minutes. The conventions 2013 Cosplay Ball benefited the Detroit Institute of Arts. In 2009, 2010, and 2014, it benefited the Cornerstone Schools of Detroit. The 2017 masquerade ball benefited the Children's Hospital of Michigan. The 2019 masquerade ball benefited the Children's Hospital of Michigan.

History
The first Youmacon took four years to plan. In 2010, Cobo Center started a $279 million renovation that finished in 2015. The 2012 convention had several complaints including the distance between venues (15 minutes) and registration line times. Youmacon is one of the larger users of the Marriott, and the only event to have all of its meeting space and 1,300 hotel rooms occupied as of 2014. The Renaissance Center prohibited attendees from carrying fake weapons and wearing masks that would hide their faces in 2014. Origa was unable to enter the United States from Canada for her 2014 Youmacon appearance due to not having a P visa. In 2016, the maid café expanded to two days, the Renaissance Center had construction occurring, and panel rooms in the Cobo Center were challenging to locate. Thursdays programming in 2017 did not require registration. The convention improved elevator lines and game room wait times, but the physical schedule copy suffered from errors in 2017.

Youmacon's in person 2020 convention was cancelled due to the COVID-19 pandemic, with an online convention held in its place. Its cancellation was delayed due to contractual issues regarding COVID-19 shutdowns. In 2021, the People Mover between event venues was not available, with the convention offering transportation for specific attendees with needs.

Event history

See also 
Midwest Media Expo
Glass City Con X Midwest Media Expo

References

External links
Youmacon website

Anime conventions in the United States
Recurring events established in 2005
2005 establishments in Michigan
Annual events in Michigan
Festivals in Detroit
Tourist attractions in Detroit
Culture of Detroit
Conventions in Michigan